RS 500 may refer to:
 Rolling Stone's 500 Greatest Albums of All Time
 RS500, dinghy
 Ford Sierra RS500 Cosworth
 Ford Focus RS500